Samuel Carrington Means (1828–1891) was the founder and first captain of the Loudoun Rangers, a Union Army unit from Virginia that served during the American Civil War.

Means was a successful gristmiller and businessman from Waterford, Virginia, with several ties through his business to Point of Rocks, Maryland, where he was station master for the B&O Railroad.  After the secession of Virginia in May 1861, Confederate authorities began to court him over the use of his mill (the largest in Loudoun County).  An erstwhile quaker and with considerable interests in loyal Maryland, Means was a unionist and would have none of it.  Consequently, the Confederates issued warrants for his arrest forcing Means to flee to Maryland on July 1, 1861 leaving his family behind.  Subsequent to his fleeing, the Confederate government seized all his property and assets in Virginia, including 28 horses, 42 hogs, 2 wagons all the flour and meal at his mill.

When Union forces under John Geary invaded Loudoun in March 1862, Means served as a scout for the force.  For his service, Secretary of War Edwin M. Stanton issued him a captaincy with permission to raise a company of cavalry for border service in Loudoun and Maryland.  The resulting Loudoun Rangers served as partisans in Loudoun for much of the war, but were eventually mustered into regular service leading to Means' departure from the unit over the issue in 1864.

References

1828 births
1891 deaths
Loudoun County in the American Civil War
People from Waterford, Virginia
Union Army officers